Aiphanes linearis is a species of flowering plant in the family Arecaceae. It is found only in Colombia.

References

linearis
Least concern plants
Endemic flora of Colombia
Taxonomy articles created by Polbot
Taxa named by Max Burret